Platform for Life and Peace (PZZhM/ПЗЖМ) is a parliamentary group in Ukraine created after the ban on the Opposition Platform — For Life and the dissolution of the parliamentary group of the same name following the 2022 Russian invasion of Ukraine.

History
The group was created on April 21, 2022, with Yuriy Boyko as its leader.

The group explicitly announced that it did not include Viktor Medvedchuk, Vadym Rabinovych, Vadym Stolar, and their supporters, who had belonged to the prior Opposition Platform — For Life party. Some of these politicians had left Ukraine before the invasion started, or are perceived as proxies for Russia within Ukraine.

Policies
According to Yuriy Boyko, the group contains "deputies willing to work for protecting Ukraine, helping the people, and rebuilding our country".

The group supports the accession of Ukraine to the European Union.

See also
Restoration of Ukraine
Opposition Platform — For Life
Opposition Bloc (2019)

References

2022 establishments in Ukraine
Centrist parties in Ukraine
Social democratic parties
Parliamentary factions in Ukraine
Political parties established in 2022
Russian political parties in Ukraine